The Pars Stadium ( Varzešgâh-è Pârs) is a multi-use stadium in Shiraz, Iran. It is mostly used for football matches. The stadium holds 50,000 people. The stadium is the forth largest stadium in Iran It is currently used mostly for football matches and is the home stadium of Persian Gulf League side, Fajr Sepasi F.C. The stadium also is used for some matches of Bargh Shiraz F.C. and Qashqai F.C. in Azadegan League.

History 
The construction project of the stadium started in 2007 in Mianrood, southern Shiraz. The stadium was finally opened in April 20, 2017 by Masoud Soltanifar, the Minister of Youth Affairs and Sports.

Transport
 Shokoofeh Metro Station
Shiraz Bus Network: 5, 69, 90, 92, 98, 152

References

Football venues in Iran
Buildings and structures in Shiraz
Sport in Shiraz
Sports venues completed in 2017
2017 establishments in Iran